Eucalyptus walshii is a small, slender, pole-like tree that is endemic to Victoria, Australia. It has smooth bark, lance-shaped to egg-shaped adult leaves, flower buds in groups of seven to eleven, white flowers and cup-shaped fruit.

Description
It has smooth whitish to grey bark, with a stocking of rough fibrous or flaky bark on the lowest  or less of the trunk. Flowering occurs in autumn and the flowers are white.

Taxonomy and naming
Eucalyptus walshii was first formally described in 2004 by Kevin James Rule in the journal Muelleria from specimens collected near Broughton's Waterhole in the Little Desert National Park in 2002.  The specific epithet honours botanist Neville Walsh of the National Herbarium of Victoria.

Distribution and habitat
This eucalypt is only known from a single population growing in mallee woodland on a low hill near the type location.

See also
List of Eucalyptus species

References

Flora of Victoria (Australia)
Trees of Australia
walshii
Myrtales of Australia
Plants described in 2004